Moganite is an oxide mineral with the chemical formula SiO2 (silicon dioxide) that was discovered in 1976. It was initially described as a new form of silica from specimens found in the Barranco de Medio Almud, in the municipality of Mogán on the island of Gran Canaria, in the Canary Islands (Spain), receiving in a later work the name derived from this locality. In 1994 the International Mineralogical Association decided to disapprove it as a valid mineral, since it was considered indistinguishable from quartz. Subsequent studies allowed the IMA to rectify it in 1999, accepting it as a mineral species.
It has the same chemical composition as quartz, but a different crystal structure.

This mineral has been mainly found in dry locales such as Gran Canaria and Lake Magadi. It has been reported from a variety of locations in Europe, India and the United States.  Physically, it has a Mohs hardness of about 6, a dull luster and appears as a semitransparent gray in color.

Structural information 
The main infrared spectroscopy (IR) differences between moganite and α-quartz occur in the wavenumber region below 650 cm−1. Above this wavenumber, the frequencies of Si–O stretching vibrations of moganite are almost identical to those of quartz. Additional moganite bands were recorded near 165, 207, 296, 343, 419, 576, and 612 cm−1.

Structural phase transition 
The in-situ Fourier transform infrared spectroscopy shows that while the thermal responses of H2O and OH in moganite display similarities to agate, the spectra are not completely identical. Absorptions in the O–H stretching region reveal that dehydration and dehydroxylation is a multistage process.

References

Monoclinic minerals
Minerals in space group 15
Oxide minerals
Silica polymorphs
Silicon compounds